Fabricio Heriberto Alfaro Torres (born May 13, 1990, in San Salvador) is a Salvadoran professional footballer who plays as a midfielder and most recently played for C.D. Águila.

Club career
Fabricio Alfaro's professional career began on July 3, 2007 when he signed a contract with now defunct Salvadoran national league club, San Salvador. He was one of six players from the El Salvador U17 national team, that would sign for San Salvador that season.

The others were Ricardo Orellana, Diego Chavarría, Xavier García, Óscar Arroyo and William Maldonado.

He made his professional debut on November 7, 2007, in a league match against Vista Hermosa, and scored his first goal on April 16, 2008 in a league match against Chalatenango.

In 2008, Alfaro signed to Chalatenango for one year.

Early in 2009, around February or March, Alfaro signed to Costa Rican club Herediano under the youth system.

For the Apertura 2010 tournament, Alfaro returned to El Salvador to play for Atlético Marte.

For the Apertura 2012 tournament, Alfaro signed for the then newly promoted team of the Primera División, Santa Tecla. Subsequently, the player would sign for Luis Ángel Firpo of Usulután.

From the Apertura 2015 tournament, Alfaro signed for UES, this being one of his biggest challenges in his career, because with the scarlet team he was fighting to avoid the relegation. After an irregular season with UES, he signed for Municipal Limeño in the Apertura 2016 tournament.

After a regular tournament with the Santa Rosa de Lima team, Alfaro signed with Isidro Metapán for the Apertura 2017. With the Santa Ana team, and after a good performance, was taken into account by Carlos de los Cobos in the calls of the El Salvador national team as 2018.

Career statistics

Club
As of November 2018.

References

1990 births
Living people
Sportspeople from San Salvador
Association football midfielders
Salvadoran footballers
San Salvador F.C. footballers
C.D. Chalatenango footballers
C.D. Atlético Marte footballers
Santa Tecla F.C. footballers
2009 CONCACAF U-20 Championship players